Antonietta is a genus of colorful sea slugs, aeolid nudibranchs, shell-less marine gastropod molluscs in the taxonomic family Facelinidae.

Species
Species within this genus include:
 Antonietta janthina Baba & Hamatani, 1977
 Antonietta luteorufa Schmekel, 1966

References

Facelinidae

br:Antonietta
it:Antonietta